Tarawera is a rural locality in the Goondiwindi Region, Queensland, Australia. In the  Tarawera had a population of 39 people.

Geography 
The land use is a mixture of grazing on native vegetation and crop growing.

Road infrastructure
The Meandarra Talwood Road (State Route 74) runs through from north to south.

History 
In the  Tarawera had a population of 39 people.

Economy 
There are a number of homesteads in the locality:

 Baquabah
 Boxyard
 Buckhaven
 Burloo
 Eaglebar
 Hillview
 Remilton
 Springmount
 Waverly
 Wilga Park
 Willow Glen

References 

Goondiwindi Region
Localities in Queensland